Andreea Bănică ( (born 21 June 1978) is a Romanian singer and songwriter. She was part of the girl groups Exotic (1998–2000) and Blondy (2001–2005). Afterwards, she started a solo career, winning various awards, including the Romanian Music Awards, Romanian Top Hits, MTV European Music Awards and the Balkan Music Awards. Bănică speaks Romanian, English, Spanish and Brazilian-Portuguese.

Career 
She first came to public attention at the 1998 Mamaia Festival. Along with Claudia Pătrăşcanu and Julia Chelaru, she started the group Exotic. In the two years they were together, the group released three singles ("Watch me", "Sexy" and "A Kiss"), and recorded two albums: Sexxy and Passionate.

Bănică started her solo career after leaving Exotic. In 2001, together with Rus, she formed the group Blondy. The group released three albums (So Close, Part of You, Sweet and Bitter) and a replay. Altogether, Blondy released six videos, and won the award for best dance band offered by Radio Romania in 2003. Rus left the band in 2005, launching a solo career. Bănică continued with Blondy. Dansez, Dansez, an album composed by Laurentiu Duta, achieved gold status for sales. Two singles were released, "Lovers" and "Sweet and Bitter".

Bănică single "Fiesta" gave her  a number one hit on the Romanian charts. She received an MTV award for "Best Solo Artist." After that, she performed under her own name.

Her second solo album was entitled Rendez-vous, from which "Fiesta" was released as a single. The second single from this album was "Rendez-vous".

In 2008 she released a new video for the song "Trust", directed by Dragos Buliga. In the spring of that year she released "Hooky Song" featuring Smiley, with a video directed by Iulian Moga.

She released a video for the song "Le Ri Ra" in March 2009 despite being pregnant. In August 2009, a new single, "Samba", was released in collaboration with Dony. This single won her the RMA Best Video award in 2010. In early 2011, a Best Of collection was released. At the RRA Awards, her 2011 song "Love in Brazil" was named best Latin dance song.

In 2019 the singer was chosen by Walt Disney Pictures to provide the Romanian voice of Juarez in the live-action G-Force.

Discography

Studio albums

Compilation

Extended plays

References

External links

 Andreea Bănică′s official website
 
 
 
 Andreea Bănică on CatMusic.ro

1978 births
Living people
People from Eforie
English-language singers from Romania
21st-century Romanian singers
21st-century Romanian women singers